The Burning World or Burning World may refer to:

 The Burning World (novel), a 1964 science fiction novel
 The Burning World (album), a 1989 rock album by Swans
 The Burning World, song/single by the band The Field Mice